Lloris is a surname of Catalan origin. It is prevalent throughout the nations of Spain and France. Notable people with the surname include:

Enedina Lloris (born 1957), Valencian Spanish soprano
Gautier Lloris (born 1995), French footballer
Hugo Lloris (born 1986), French footballer

See also
Loris (disambiguation)
Lorris, a commune in the Loiret department in north-central France

Catalan-language surnames